Lukala is one of a number of towns in the Democratic Republic of the Congo with this name.  This one is in Bas-Congo province, nearest the ocean.

Transport 

Lukala is served by Lukala Airport and by a station on the Congo Railway network.

Industry 

Lukala has a cement works.

See also 

 Railway stations in DRCongo.

References 

Populated places in Kongo Central